Henry Woods (1822 – 16 May 1882) was an English cotton manufacturer and colliery owner and a Liberal Party politician who sat in the House of Commons from 1857 to 1874.

Woods was the son of William Woods of Wigan and his wife Elizabeth Marsden, daughter of Jonathan Marsden. He was a cotton manufacturer at Wigan, and a colliery owner. He was Deputy Lieutenant and J.P. for Lancashire.
 
At the 1857 general election Woods was elected as a Member of Parliament (MP) for Wigan. He held the seat until 1874.

Woods died at the age of 59.

Woods married firstly in 1854 Hannah Hindley daughter of Charles Hindley  MP of Portland House, Ashton-under-Lyne. She died in 1857 and he married secondly in 1864, Henrietta Emma Gilbert, daughter of Ashurst Gilbert, Bishop of Chichester.

References

External links

1822 births
1882 deaths
Liberal Party (UK) MPs for English constituencies
UK MPs 1857–1859
UK MPs 1859–1865
UK MPs 1865–1868
UK MPs 1868–1874
Deputy Lieutenants of Lancashire
British textile industry businesspeople
Members of the Parliament of the United Kingdom for Wigan